Miklós Szilvási (5 December 1925 – 24 May 1969) was a Hungarian welterweight Greco-Roman wrestler. He competed at the 1948, 1952 and 1956 Summer Olympics and won a silver medal in 1948 and a gold in 1952. He lost the 1948 final to Gösta Andersson, but avenged the loss in the 1952 final.

References

1925 births
1969 deaths
Olympic wrestlers of Hungary
Wrestlers at the 1948 Summer Olympics
Wrestlers at the 1952 Summer Olympics
Wrestlers at the 1956 Summer Olympics
Hungarian male sport wrestlers
Olympic gold medalists for Hungary
Olympic medalists in wrestling
World Wrestling Championships medalists
Medalists at the 1952 Summer Olympics
Medalists at the 1948 Summer Olympics
Olympic silver medalists for Hungary
Sportspeople from Pest County
20th-century Hungarian people